Röttgen is a surname. Notable people with the surname include:

Norbert Röttgen (born 1965), German lawyer and politician 
Wil Röttgen (born 1966), German actor